Staff Sergeant Barbara Olive Barnwell, USMCR (born c. 1928)  was the first female Marine to be awarded the Navy and Marine Corps Medal, which she was awarded on August 7, 1953, for saving a fellow Marine from drowning in the Atlantic Ocean near Camp Lejeune in 1952. She was born in Kansas City.

See also
 List of women's firsts

References

Sources
Military Women "Firsts"

1920s births
Possibly living people
United States Marines
Female United States Marine Corps personnel
Recipients of the Navy and Marine Corps Medal